Charcoal is the debut album by Champaign, Illinois, indie rock band Sarge.  It was released in 1996 on Mud Records, and featured the single "Dear Josie, Love Robyn".

Track listing
"Smoke"
"Backlash"
"Dear Josie, Love Robyn"
"Chicago"
"Crush"
"Bedroom"
"I Don't"
"Another Gear Uncaught"
"The Last Boy"

References

1996 debut albums
Sarge (band) albums
Parasol Records albums